Marco Sala (born 4 June 1999) is an Italian professional footballer who plays as a left back for  club Palermo, on loan from Sassuolo.

Club career

Inter Milan 
Born in Rho, Sala was a youth exponent of Inter.

Loan to Arezzo 
On 2 August 2018, Sala was loaned to Serie C club Arezzo on a 2-year loan deal. On 16 September he made his made his professional debut in Serie C for Arezzo in a 1–0 away win over Lucchese. On 7 October he was sent-off with a double yellow card in the 77th minute of a 0–0 away draw against Robur Siena. Three weeks later, on 21 October, he scored his first professional goal in the 92nd minute of a 2–0 home win over Albissola. On 25 November he scored his second goal in the 73rd minute of a 2–0 away win over Piacenza. Sala helped the club to reach the play-off, however the club was eliminated by Pisa losing 4–2 on aggregate in the quarter-finals and he ended his first season to Arezzo with 39 appearances, 2 goals and 8 assists.

Sassuolo 
On 30 June 2019, Sala joined Sassuolo.

Loan to Virtus Entella
On 6 August 2019, Sala joined to newly Serie B promoted club Virtus Entella on loan until 30 June 2020. Five days later, on 11 August, he made his debut for the club in a 2–1 home defeat against Südtirol in the second round of Coppa Italia, he played the entire match. Two more weeks later, on 24 August, he made his Serie B debut for Virtus Entella in a 1–0 home win over Livorno and he played again the entire match. He became a regular starter early in the season. Sala ended his season-long loan to Virtus Entella with 34 appearances, including 32 of them as a starter, he was replaced only 2 times during the season, and he also made 6 assist during the loan.

Loan to SPAL
On 26 September 2020 he joined SPAL on a season-long loan deal. Four days later, on 30 September, Sala made his debut for the club in a match won 4–2 at penalties after a 0–0 home draw against Bari in the second round of Coppa Italia, he played the entire match. On 3 October he made his league debut for the club as a substitute replacing Marco D'Alessandro in the 78th minute of a 1–1 home draw against Cosenza. On 20 October, Sala played his first match as a starter for the club in Serie B in a 2–1 away defeat against Empoli, he was replaced by Bartosz Salamon after 71 minutes. Twelve days later, on 1 November, he played his first entire match for the club, a 1–0 away win over Reggina. Sala ended his season-long loan to SPAL with 37 appearances, including 23 of them as a starter and 4 assists.

Loan to Crotone 
On 17 August 2021, Sala was loaned to Serie B side Crotone on a season-long loan deal.

Loan to Palermo 
On 28 July 2022, Sala was loaned to Palermo in Serie B, with an option to buy.

International career
He made his debut with the Italy U21 on 6 September 2019, in a friendly match won 4–0 against Moldova.

Career statistics

Club

Honours

Club 
Inter Primavera

 Campionato Nazionale Primavera: 2016–17, 2017–18
 Supercoppa Primavera: 2018
 Torneo di Viareggio: 2018

References

1999 births
People from Rho, Lombardy
Footballers from Lombardy
Living people
Italian footballers
Italy youth international footballers
Italy under-21 international footballers
Association football defenders
S.S. Arezzo players
Virtus Entella players
S.P.A.L. players
F.C. Crotone players
Palermo F.C. players
Serie C players
Serie B players
Sportspeople from the Metropolitan City of Milan